Yücel Gündoğdu (born August 10, 1985) is a European champion Turkish karateka competing in the kumite -65 kg division. He is a member of the İstanbul Büyükşehir Belediyesi S.K.

Achievements
2012
  17th World Championships - November 21, Paris FRA - kumite team 
  47th European Championships - May 10, Tenerife ESP - kumite team 
  16th Balkan Children & Seniors karate championships - March 16, Herceg Novi MNE - kumite -67 kg

2011
  9th European Karate Regions Championships - June 4, Ankara TUR - kumite team

2010
  1st World Clubs Cup - November 20, Istanbul TUR - kumite team 
  14th Balkan Children & Senior Karate Championships - September 24, Louraki GRE - kumite -67 kg 
  14th Balkan Children & Senior Karate Championships - September 24, Louraki GRE - kumite team 
  8th European Karate Regions Championships - May 29, Warsaw POL - kumite team

2008
  19th World Karate Championships - November 13, Tokyo JPN - kumite team

2007
  European Championships - May 4, Bratislava SVK - kumite -65 kg 
  Italian Open - March 31, Monza ITA - kumite -65 kg

2006
  41st European Championships - May 5, Stavanger NOR - kumite team

2005
  4th World Junior & Cadet Championships - November 11, Limassol CYP - kumite junior -60 kg 
  4th World Junior & Cadet Championships - November 11, Limassol CYP - kumite junior team 
  32nd European Cadet & Junior Championships -February 11, Thessaloniki GRE - kumite junior -60 kg 
  32nd European Cadet & Junior Championships -February 11, Thessaloniki GRE - kumite junior team

References

1985 births
Living people
Turkish male karateka
Istanbul Büyükşehir Belediyespor athletes
21st-century Turkish people